Barug Alang sa Kauswagan ug Demokrasya (English: Stand for Development and Democracy) commonly known as BAKUD, is a local political party based in Cebu's 5th congressional district, Philippines. It is a political party run by the Durano family of Cebu formed in 2001.

BAKUD is currently affiliated with the Nationalist People's Coalition since 2018.

Notable members
Agnes Magpale - former Cebu Vice Governor (2010–2019), and Provincial Board Member from the Fifth District of Cebu (1992–2001; 2004–2011)

References

Local political parties in the Philippines
Politics of Cebu